The Estonian men's national under 20 ice hockey team is the national under-20 ice hockey team in Estonia. The team represents Estonia at the International Ice Hockey Federation's World Junior Hockey Championship Division II.

World Junior Championships record

Roster
Roster for the 2019 World Junior Ice Hockey Championships – Division II.

See also
Estonia men's national ice hockey team
Estonia men's national under-18 ice hockey team

References

External links
Estonian men's national junior ice hockey team roster 
iihf.com: Estonia

Ice hockey
Junior national ice hockey teams
Estonia men's national ice hockey team